Nersingen is a municipality in the District of Neu-Ulm in Bavaria, Germany. The neighbours are Neu-Ulm, Elchingen, Bibertal and Pfaffenhofen an der Roth.

Geography

Geographic location

Through the area of Nersingen flow three rivers: The Danube in the north and her both supply rivers Roth and Leibi, which cross Nersingen from south to north. Also, there are some water ditches and some excavator lakes, which resulted from gravel quarrying. The most part of Nersingen is on the gravellic ground.

Municipality arrangement

The municipality of Nersingen consists of the principal village of Nersingen and the part villages Straß, Leibi, Unterfahlheim, and Oberfahlheim.

Economics and infrastructure

Companies
Hilti AG in Straß

Traffic

Nersingen lies next to the Bundesautobahn 7 and the train line Ulm - Munich. The Bundesstraße 10 passes the municipality parts Unterfahlheim, Oberfahlheim and Nersingen.

Education

There are two elementary schools and one elementary- and principal school.

Objects of interest

 "Bräuhaus Seybold" in Nersingen
 "Museum für bildende Kunst" in Oberfahlheim
 Church "St. Johann Baptist" in Straß
 Church "St. Dionysius" in Oberfahlheim
 Church "St. Nikolaus" in Nersingen

References

External links
  

Neu-Ulm (district)